Shame are an English post-punk band originally from South London, England. The band consists of lead vocalist Charlie Steen, guitarists Eddie Green and Sean Coyle-Smith, bassist Josh Finerty and drummer Charlie Forbes. 

Signed to Dead Oceans, the band's debut album Songs of Praise was released on 12 January 2018. This was followed by Drunk Tank Pink on 15 January 2021, which debuted at number eight on the UK Albums Chart. The band's third album Food for Worms was released on 24 February 2023. The group has received critical acclaim from publications including NME, Paste, and Clash.

History
Shame released their debut album Songs of Praise on 12 January 2018 through Dead Oceans, and it was met with critical acclaim. The record currently holds an aggregated score of 83 based on 20 reviews. The album peaked at number 32 on the UK Albums Chart and remained on the chart for two weeks.

In late January 2020, NME reported that Shame was working on their second studio album and that recording had been complete. On 18 November 2020, the band confirmed that their second studio album, entitled Drunk Tank Pink, would come out 15 January 2021, a little more than three years after their debut album. In December 2020, Shame released the single "Snow Day" with an accompanying visualiser from their second album Drunk Tank Pink.

In November 2022, in correlation with their single "Fingers of Steel", their third album was announced, and the singles "Six-Pack" and "Adderall" were released before it came out. The album, Food for Worms, was released on February 24, 2023.

Band members 

 Charlie Steen – lead vocals (2014–present)
 Eddie Green – guitar (2014–present)
 Sean Coyle-Smith – guitar (2014–present)
 Josh Finerty – bass (2014–present)
 Charlie Forbes – drums (2014–present)

Discography

Studio albums

Live albums

EPs

Singles

References

External links

 Official website

Musical groups established in 2010
English alternative rock groups
Dead Oceans artists
Musical groups from London
2010 establishments in England